The fulvous babbler or fulvous chatterer (Argya fulva) is a species of bird in the family Leiothrichidae. It is 25 cm long with a wingspan of 27–30.5 cm. It is warm brown above with very faint streaking on the crown and back. The throat is whitish and the rest of the underparts are pale brown.

It is found in northern Africa south to the Sahel region and occurs in Algeria, Chad, Egypt, Eritrea, Ethiopia, Libya, Mali, Mauritania, Morocco, Niger, Nigeria, Senegal, Sudan, and Tunisia. Its natural habitat is subtropical or tropical dry shrubland.

The fulvous babbler was formerly placed in the genus Turdoides but following the publication of a comprehensive molecular phylogenetic study in 2018, it was moved to the resurrected genus Argya.

References

 Collar, N. J. & Robson, C. (2007). Family Timaliidae (Babblers)  pp. 70–291 in del Hoyo, J., Elliott, A. & Christie, D.A. eds. Handbook of the Birds of the World, Vol. 12. Picathartes to Tits and Chickadees. Lynx Edicions, Barcelona.
 Snow, D. W. & Perrins, C. M. (1998). Birds of the Western Palearctic: Concise Edition, Vol. 2, Oxford University Press, Oxford.

Argya
Birds of North Africa
Birds described in 1789
Taxa named by René Louiche Desfontaines
Taxonomy articles created by Polbot